Ana Maria Vlădulescu (born 4 March 2001) is a Romanian footballer who plays as a midfielder for the Romania women's national team.

International goals

References

2001 births
Living people
Women's association football midfielders
Romanian women's footballers
Romania women's international footballers